Government Medical College, Jalaun  is a government medical college located in Orai city of Jalaun district, Uttar Pradesh, India. This college has a special component plan.

courses

Every year 100 students are allowed to take admission in the M.B.B.S. course by competitive examinations.

References

3. www.gmcjalaun.com

Medical colleges in Uttar Pradesh
Orai
2013 establishments in Uttar Pradesh
Educational institutions established in 2013